Gulumbu Yunupingu (1943 – 10 May 2012), after her death known as Djotarra or Ms Yunupingu, was an Australian Aboriginal artist and women's leader from the Yolngu people of Arnhem Land, in the Northern Territory of Australia.

Early life and family
Born in Gunyangara, Northern Territory in 1943, Yunupingu was a member of the Gumatj clan and spoke the Gumatj language. Daughter of artist and Gumatj leader Mungurrawuy Yunupingu, she was sister to Aboriginal leader Galarrwuy Yunupingu; singer Mandawuy Yunupingu (of Yothu Yindi); artists Nancy Gaymala Yunupingu and Nyapanyapa Yunupingu; and several others. Their mother was artist and elder Bakili.

Artworks
In 1999, together with her sister Gaymala and Dhuwarrwarr Marika, Gulumbu was engaged to paint a large film set for the film Yolngu Boy, based on the historic Yirrkala Church Panels.

In 2012, a painting on wood titled Garrurru (Sail), weighing a tonne and measuring seven by three metres, was installed at the Australian National University, at the Hedley Bull Centre for World Politics.  Yunupingu appeared in public at the launch for the last time, despite failing health.

Exhibitions and collections
Her art has been widely exhibited all around the world, and was the opening exhibit in the newly-restored $370 million Quai Branly Museum in Paris.

Her work is also exhibited in the National Gallery of Australia.

In 2018 Yunupingu's work was included in the exhibition Marking the Infinite: Contemporary Women Artists from Aboriginal Australia at The Phillips Collection.

Awards
Yunupingu she has won many awards for her work. In 2004 she won the 21st National Aboriginal & Torres Strait Islander Art Award for a piece entitled Garak, The Universe, which consists of three memorial poles, decorated in her own style, which combines traditional Yolngu designs with her own modern interpretation.

Death
She died on 9 May at her home in Gunyangara (Ski Beach), after lapsing into a coma some time before. Given her world-wide renown, her family gave consent to her name appearing in text, but asked that her name is not spoken, and no image of her shown. She can be referred to as Djotarra or Ms Yunupingu.

References

External links
Entry for Gulumbu Yunupingu in the National Gallery of Australia
 Artist's Interview with her in The Age
Biography in OzArts

1940s births
2012 deaths
Artists from the Northern Territory
Australian Aboriginal artists
Australian women painters
20th-century Australian women artists
20th-century Australian artists